A cong is a form of ancient Chinese jade artifact. It was later also used in ceramics.

History 
The earliest cong were produced by the Liangzhu culture (3400-2250 BC); later examples date mainly from the Shang and Zhou dynasties.

Interest in the jade shape developed during the 12th-13th century Song dynasty. The shape continued to be used in ceramic and metalwork for centuries.

Description 
A cong is a straight tube with a circular bore and square outer section with more or less convex sides.  The outer surface is divided vertically or horizontally such that the whole defines a hollow cylinder embedded in a partial rectangular block.  Proportions vary: a cong may be squat or taller than it is wide.  The outer faces are sometimes decorated with mask-like faces, which may be related to the taotie designs found on later bronze vessels.

Although it is generally considered to be a ritual object of some sort, the original function and meaning of the cong are unknown.  Later writings speak of the cong as symbolizing the earth, while the bi represents the heavens. The square represents the earth and a circle represents the heavens.

Further reading
Les jades néolithiques chinois / [contributions de Christophe Comentale, Laurent Long, Tong Peihua, Zhang Jingguo]; [pour l'ACI Du chopper au brilliant], [Paris] : Museum national d'histoire naturelle, cop. 2008, 1 vol. (81 p.) : ill., couv. ill.; 30 cm
Art et archéologie : la Chine du Néolithique à la fin des Cinq Dynasties, 960 de notre ère / Danielle Elisseeff; Paris : École du Louvre : RMN, 2008
"Neolithic Chinese Jades", Angus Forsyth, in Jade. Ed. Roger Keverne. New York: Van Nostrand Reinhold, 1991. pp. 88–109.

References

External links

http://www.asia.si.edu/explore/china/jades/gallery.asp#cong
http://www.metmuseum.org/art/collection/search/72376
https://www.britishmuseum.org/visiting/galleries/asia/room_33b_chinese_jade.aspx

Archaeological artifacts of China
Archaeological artefact types
Chinese porcelain
Chinese pottery
Hardstone carving
Pottery shapes
Jade